Handmade jewelry (or handmade jewellery or handcrafted jewellery) is jewelry which has been assembled and formed by hand rather than through the use of machines. 

The oldest handmade jewelry trademark is in Florence, Italy.

Definition (U.S.)
According to the guidelines of the U.S. Federal Trade Commission, in order to be stamped or called "handmade" in United States, the work must be made solely by hand power or hand guidance. This means that jewelry may be made using drills, lathes, or other machinery, but it must be guided by the human hand. 

This precludes the use of hand procedures such as hammering, doming, sawing, filing, soldering, finishing, punch presses, CNC machinery, and casting, to name a few processes the use of which would make the jewelry not qualify as "handmade". Beyond that, handmade jewelry can be made out of any material and with a wide variety of techniques.
Advantages
It allows exclusivity as each item is unique
It exhibits the individuality and exclusivity of craftsmen

Types of handmade jewelry 
Handmade jewellery and handicrafts are a part of culture in many parts on the world. Handmade jewelry can be made using any materials and techniques provided they are manually done. Some of these handmade jewels are quite popular around the world. Based on the materials used and styles adopted, there are many types of handmade jewelry,

 Wire wrapped jewelry
 Beaded jewelry
 Fabricated jewelry
 Polymer clay jewelry
 Terracotta jewelry
 Handmade silver jewelry
 Handmade gold jewelry
 Handmade metallic jewelry
 Paper jewelry
 Wood Jewelry
 Resin Jewelry
 Crochet jewelry
 Enameled jewelry
 Engraved jewelry

Awards
Awards for handmade jewelry include:
 American Gem Trade Association Spectrum Awards  
 Gem Center Idar Oberstein Awards, named for Idar Oberstein.
 De Beers Awards

See also
 
 Art jewelry
 Indie design
 Jewellery design
 Lapidary clubs
 Watchmaking

References

.
Handicrafts
Jewellery
Articles containing video clips